Nova Sela ("New Villages") may refer to:
 Nova Sela, Trilj, a village near Trilj, Croatia
 Nova Sela, Omiš, a village near Omiš, Croatia
 Nova Sela, Kula Norinska, a village near Kula Norinska, Croatia
 Nova Sela, Kostel, a village near Kostel, Slovenia

See also
 Stara Sela ("Old Villages"), a village near Kamnik, Slovenia
 Novo Selo (disambiguation)